Total Serene (stylised in all lowercase) is the second extended play by Australian alternative band Gang of Youths, released on 16 July 2021 via Mosy Recordings and Sony Music Australia. The EP was released without notice and is the first collection of new tracks from the band since their second album, Go Farther in Lightness (2017).

The EP features two original tracks and a cover of Elbow's "Asleep in the Back". Dave Le'aupepe explained its inclusion to the ABC saying, "We love Elbow and we thought it was thematically relevant."

Singles
Total Serene was preceded by the single "The Angel of 8th Ave.", released on 15 June 2021. "The Angel of 8th Ave." debuted and peaked at number 48 on the ARIA Singles Chart, surpassing "Let Me Down Easy" (which peaked at number 49 in February 2018) as their highest peak in Australia.

Second single "Unison" was released the same day at the EP. Le'aupepe said upon the single's release "'Unison' is a deeply important track for us that really signals where the music is headed on the new record.".

Track listing

Notes
 All track titles are stylised in all lowercase.

References

2021 EPs
Gang of Youths EPs
Sony Music Australia EPs